Dayna Deruelle (born June 17, 1982) is a Canadian curler from Brampton, Ontario. He currently skips a rink on the World Curling Tour.

His team competes in various events on the Ontario Curling Tour throughout the season and competes annually in the Ontario Curling Association Dominion Tankard play downs. Deruelle and his teammates Andrew McGaugh, Kevin Lagerquist and Evan DeViller enjoyed some success in their first season as a team when they qualified to represent Region 3 in the 2012 Ontario Dominion Tankard in Stratford, Ontario. Furthermore, the team qualified for the playoffs after finishing 5-5 in the round robin and winning a tie-breaker.

In 2013, Team Deruelle once again qualified to represent Region 3 in 2013 Ontario Dominion Tankard, this time being played at the Barrie Molson Centre in Barrie, ON. The foursome started the week slow but climbed back to a respectable 4-6 record to finish off the championships.

Deruelle joined the Jake Walker rink at third in 2013. With Team Walker, he finished fourth at the 2014 provincial championship, but they failed to make it back in 2015. Deruelle left the team after that season to form his own rink with Kevin Flewwelling, David Staples and Sean Harrison. The team made it to the 2016 Ontario Tankard, finishing 4-6. The next season, at the 2017 Ontario Tankard, they won one fewer game, finishing 3-6. The team played in the 2017 Olympic Pre-Trials, where they lost in a tiebreaker. The team failed to qualify for the 2018 Tankard, and broke up after the season.

In 2018, Deruelle formed a new team with Brent Ross, Ryan Werenich and Shawn Kaufman. They qualified for the 2019 Ontario Tankard, where Deruelle led the team to a 4–5 record. The team didn't make it to provincials again until 2023.

Personal life
Deruelle is employed as a sales executive for Grand Slam Media. He is married to Nicole Deruelle.

Teammates

2012-13 Results

2011-12 Results 

C = Champions 
F = Finalist 
SF = Semi-Finalist 
QF = Quarter=-Finalist 
CW = Consolation Winner 
A Side = A Event Qualifier 
B Side = B Event Qualifier 
DNQ = Did Not Qualify

References 

CurlingZone profile

Sportspeople from Brampton
Curlers from Toronto
1982 births
Living people
Canadian male curlers
21st-century Canadian people